A chess puzzle is a puzzle in which knowledge of the pieces and rules of chess is used to solve logically a chess-related problem. The history of chess puzzles reaches back to the Middle Ages and has evolved since then. 

Usually the goal is to find the single best, ideally aesthetic move or a series of single best moves in a chess position, which was created by a composer or is from a real game. But puzzles can also set different objectives. Examples include deducing the last move played, the location of a missing piece, or whether a player has lost the right to castle. Sometimes the objective is antithetical to normal chess, such as helping (or even compelling) the opponent to checkmate one's own king.

Chess problems

While a chess puzzle is any puzzle involving aspects of chess, a chess problem is an arranged position with a specific task to be fulfilled, such as White mates in n moves. Chess problems are also known as chess compositions because the positions are specially devised, rather than arising from actual games. Chess problems are divided into orthodox and heterodox types, both covering a variety of genres.

Orthodox chess problems employ the standard rules of chess and involve positions that can arise from actual game play (although the process of getting to that position may be unrealistic). The most common orthodox chess puzzle takes the form of checkmate in n moves. The puzzle positions are seldom similar to positions from actual play, and the challenge is not to find a winning move, but rather to find the (usually unique) move which forces checkmate as rapidly as possible.

Heterodox chess problems involve conditions that are impossible with normal play, such as multiple kings or chess variants, while fairy chess problems employ pieces not used in orthodox chess, such as the amazon (a piece combining the powers of the queen and the knight).

Tactical puzzles
Chess puzzles can also be regular positions from a game (with normal rules), usually meant as training positions, tactical or positional, from all phases of the game (openings, middlegame and endings). These are known as tactical puzzles. They can range from a simple "Mate in one" combination to a complex attack on the opponent's king. Solving tactical chess puzzles is a very common chess teaching technique. Although it is unlikely that the same position will occur in a game the student plays, the recognition of certain patterns can help to find a good move or plan in another position.

Mathematical chess problems 

Some chess problems, like the Eight queens puzzle or the knight's tour problem, have connections to mathematics, especially to graph theory and combinatorics. Many famous mathematicians have studied such problems, including Euler, Legendre, and Gauss. Besides finding a solution to a particular puzzle, mathematicians are usually interested in counting the total number of possible solutions, finding solutions with certain properties, and generalization of the problems to n×n or rectangular boards.

See also
Wheat and chessboard problem
Mutilated chessboard problem

References

External links

 Lifetime updates and many chesspuzzles 
 Chess puzzles anyone can add or edit
 Collection of tactical chess puzzles
 Chess puzzles with the solution hints
 Chess puzzles with easy, med, hard categories
 Open-source chess puzzles
 Blitz chess puzzles

Chess problems
Mathematical chess problems